South Fremantle might refer to:
 South Fremantle, Western Australia, a suburb of Perth
 Electoral district of South Fremantle, an electoral district of the Western Australian Legislative Assembly that existed between 1890 and 1962
 South Fremantle Football Club
 South Fremantle Power Station